Headbutt is a sculpture by French-Algerian artist Adel Abdessemed. It is 5 m (16.4 ft) tall and made from bronze. It was unveiled on 26 September 2012 at the Centre Pompidou in Paris, France.

Background 

The sculpture depicts an incident that took place in the 110th minute of the 2006 FIFA World Cup Final between France and Italy,  when Zinedine Zidane headbutted Italian defender Marco Materazzi in the chest after Materazzi had verbally provoked him.  Zidane consequently received a red card and was sent off. France lost the match, which was Zidane's final match as a professional footballer.

Exhibition

Pompidou Centre 
As France subsequently lost the match, exhibition organiser Alain Michaud has described it as "...against the tradition of making statues in honour of certain victories. It is an ode to defeat".

Qatar Museums Authority 
As part of Qatar Museums Authority public art program the sculpture was brought to Doha for an undisclosed amount on 4 October 2013, intended to be permanently installed on the Corniche near Al Mourjan restaurant.

The sculpture was removed on 30 October, owing to criticism from Islamic conservatives who complained that glorifying the infamous act of violence set a bad example for local youth and bordered on idolatry. It was then moved into the Arab Museum of Modern Art in Doha.

The statue has also been exhibited in Tuscany and Avignon.

See also 

 List of association football statues

References

Bronze sculptures in Paris
2012 sculptures
Monuments and memorials in Paris
Buildings and structures in Doha
2006 FIFA World Cup
Association football sculptures
Zinedine Zidane
Statues of sportspeople
Statues in France
Statues in Qatar
Sculptures of men
Sports culture in France
Cultural depictions of association football players
Cultural depictions of French men
Cultural depictions of Italian men
Sculptures in the collection of the Musée National d'Art Moderne